Penile dysmorphic disorder, sometimes abbreviated as PDD, is a psychological phenomenon effecting some men, who find their reproductive organs, especially the penis, to be too minuscule. The person might be unreasonably troubled about the size of their genitalia. Sometimes the situation escalates into severe depression and anxiety, and into defect in occupational and social functioning, and even absolute social isolation.

Diagnosis
There is no official diagnosis for penile dysmorphic disorder in DSM. However, it is sometimes considered as a sidekick of body dysmorphic disorder, which in turn, does have an official diagnosis in the DSM.

Mass culture
In 1995 Finnish musical comedy band Turo's Hevi Gee released an album Putket mutkalla, in which the 2nd track has a song titled Peeniskateus, which tells a story about a man with inferiority complex regarding his minuscule penis.

See also

 Genital retraction syndrome
 Human penis size
 Micropenis
 Muscle dysmorphia
 Napoleon complex
 Penis envy
 Small penis humiliation

References

Body shape
Human appearance
Human penis
Human size